Srimushnam Srinivasa Murthy (19 May 1923 – 24 November 2009) was a Gandhian Freedom Fighter and a Kannada writer based in Bangalore. He was born on 19 May 1923 in Mysore to Srimushnam Rangacharya and Kaveri Bai. He has written many books in kannada, one of them being Vedanta Samanvaya, which is  a synthesis of the classic interpretations of Upanishads and Brahma Sutras by Ramanuja, Madhvacharya and Shankaracharya. He was an employee of Hindustan Aeronautics Limited.He also served as General Secretary of the Hindustan Aircraft Employees' Association.

Works
Devaru (A book written in reply to A. N. Murthy Rao's Devaru)
Geeta Samanvaya
Vedanta Samanvaya

See also
A.N. Murthy Rao
Upanishads
Dvaita
Advaita
Vishishtadvaita

References

Kannada-language writers
Writers from Bangalore
Indian independence activists from Karnataka
2009 deaths
1923 births